The Immortal Hulk, introduced as the Devil Hulk, is a fictional alternate-personality character appearing in American comic books published by Marvel Comics.

Publication history
The Devil Hulk first appeared in The Incredible Hulk (vol. 2) #13 (April 2000) and was created by Paul Jenkins, Ron Garney, and Sal Buscema. The Devil Hulk returns in Hulk form in The Immortal Hulk, a Marvel Comics series that was launched with issue #1 on June 6, 2018. The series writer, Al Ewing, stated " I wanted to give some much-needed nuance to Bruce and the Hulk's side of this story – and also reveal more about the Banner/Hulk dynamic at the core of Immortal Hulk". The Immortal Hulk series is penciled by Joe Bennett, and features covers by such artists as Alex Ross, Kaare Andrews, Clayton Crain, and Sal Buscema.

Fictional character history

As the Devil Hulk
The Devil Hulk is an alternate personality of Bruce Banner, personifying all of Bruce's resentment at the way he is treated by the world, and all his negative emotions such as self-hatred. The Devil Hulk is also one of the Hulk's enemies, constantly threatening to escape the confines of Bruce's mind and destroy the world that has tormented and abused them. While the character's physical appearance varies, he is always depicted as having glowing red eyes and reptilian traits.

The Devil Hulk first appears when Bruce uses a machine created by Angela Lipscombe to travel into his own mind, which is being overtaken by the Guilt Hulk as he begins to die of Lou Gehrig's disease. In a cavern containing innumerable other personalities frozen in ice, Bruce finds the Devil Hulk unfrozen but bound by chains. After explaining the nature of his existence, the Devil Hulk says he will banish the Guilt Hulk (his inability to feel guilt giving him the advantage over the entity) if Bruce releases him from his shackles, but Bruce refuses the Devil Hulk's offer to help, and flees, managing to keep the Devil Hulk contained and ensure the future safety of the world by making a deal with the three 'primary' Hulk personas (the Savage Hulk, the Grey Hulk, and Professor Hulk) that they will share control of the body once Banner's disease becomes too serious while leaving Banner with some degree of awareness and control. Later, Bruce's mind is thrown into disarray by the experiments of John Ryker, allowing the Devil Hulk to escape the cave from which he taunts Bruce.

As Bruce's condition became worse, the Devil Hulk enacts a plan to manifest in the real world by trapping Bruce's consciousness in an illusionary utopia. The three core Hulk personalities manage to break through the fantasy and Bruce leaves it, rejecting the Devil Hulk's offer to repair it and allow Bruce to live peacefully within it in exchange for control of Bruce's physical body.

The Devil Hulk is last seen being overpowered by the Savage and Grey Hulks in the mindscape, while threatening everyone and everything held dear by Bruce, apparently being permanently contained back within the recesses of Banner's mind after his disease had been treated.

During the Chaos War story line, Brian Banner is released from Hell and becomes a hybrid of the Guilt Hulk and the Devil Hulk.

As the Immortal Hulk
After Bruce Banner's death during Civil War II and subsequent resurrection during the events of Avengers: No Surrender, the Devil Hulk suppressed the rest of Banner's personalities and became the "dominant" Hulk. Now calling themselves the "Immortal Hulk" — due to it manifesting at night even if Banner is killed during the day and apparently unable to be killed itself — the collective personalities reveal during a conversation with Doc Samson that the Immortal Hulk actually embodies Banner's desire for a protective father figure, and that Banner's inability to "imagine love without pain" is why he had previously perceived it as being a malevolent, sadistic entity.

During the events of "Absolute Carnage", the Venom Symbiote takes Bruce as its host to fight Carnage. Inside of Bruce's mind, Bruce converses with the Venom Symbiote as the other Hulk personalities such as Joe Fixit and the Savage Hulk add their opinions about their current situation. The Immortal Hulk (in his more traditional looking reptilian form) is against the symbiote's presence in Bruce and says it should be removed immediately, saying they have more important matters to deal with. In the end, Bruce, Joe Fixit, and the Savage Hulk agree to collaborate with the Venom Symbiote and the Immortal Hulk storms off, saying they are making a mistake.

When Bruce was affected by Xemnu's mental manipulations, the Immortal Hulk was imprisoned inside of Bruce's mindscape, leaving the Savage Hulk in control. When the Leader finds his way into the mindscape as well via the Green Door and takes over the Green Scar personality, the Immortal Hulk watches as Bruce and Joe Fixit are imprisoned as well. Feeling angrier than ever before, the Immortal Hulk breaks free from his cage and confronts the Leader. Before he can defeat him, the Immortal Hulk is stopped by the Savage Hulk, who is being emotionally manipulated by the Leader. The Immortal Hulk is beheaded by a monstrous Leader and his heart is ripped out. His corpse, alongside Banner, is taken to the Below-Place by the Leader.

Powers and abilities
Like the traditional Hulk, he possesses superhuman strength and stamina. As it took both the Savage Hulk and the Grey Hulk personas to hold him down when he attempted to escape while Banner was being treated for a presumably incurable disease, the Devil Hulk appeared to be stronger than any of the previously introduced Hulks. However, since this confrontation took place on the mental plane, it reflects the force of the Devil Hulk's will compared to the more child-minded Hulks rather than providing a clear indication of their actual physical strength. During the Immortal Hulk series, it was shown that the Devil Hulk persona is even stronger than the Green Scar (World War Hulk). Thanks to his intelligence, he has the ability to detect lies from people who hurt him. His newfound level of strength was enough to throw Hercules and Thor away by a mere flex of his muscles, and he is capable of leveling a mountain with an ability called Gamma Burst. Due to gamma radiation from the Below-Place, regeneration is seen in a more gruesome detail. During an experiment where the Hulk’s body is torn apart, he can remain alive and control every non-attached limb.

In other media
 The Devil Hulk appears as a boss in The Incredible Hulk: Ultimate Destruction voiced by Richard Moll. He attempts to gain control of Bruce Banner's body, claiming to be a natural stage in the gamma evolution process. With Doc Samson's, Banner constructs a machine that allows him to enter his own mind and defeat the Devil Hulk. 
 The Immortal Hulk appears as a playable character in Marvel Contest of Champions.

References

External links 
 

Characters created by Paul Jenkins (writer)
Characters created by Sal Buscema
Comics characters introduced in 2000
Hulk (comics)
Marvel Comics characters who can move at superhuman speeds
Marvel Comics characters with accelerated healing
Marvel Comics characters with superhuman strength
Marvel Comics mutates
Marvel Comics scientists